Salomão Manuel Troco (born 10 May 1992) is an Angolan footballer who plays for C.D. Primeiro de Agosto and the Angola national football team.

International career
Paízo made his senior international debut on 19 December 2012 in a 1-0 friendly victory over Cameroon.

Honors

Club
Primeiro de Agosto
Girabola Champion: 2018

References

External links

1992 births
Living people
C.D. Primeiro de Agosto players
Girabola players
Angolan footballers
Angola international footballers
Association football defenders
Footballers from Luanda
2019 Africa Cup of Nations players
Angola A' international footballers
2022 African Nations Championship players